Garay may refer to:

 Garay (surname)
 Gəray, a municipality in Azerbaijan
 Garay Department, Santa Fe Province, Argentina
 Garay alphabet, a script used by a small minority to write the Wolof language of West Africa
 Garay (ship), a type of warship used by Moro pirates in the Philippines
 Leslie Andrew Garay (1924–2016), an American botanist, whose author abbreviation is Garay
 Terminal de Transportación Pública Carlos Garay, a bus terminal in Ponce, Puerto Rico
 Carlos J. Garay Villamil, a prominent coachman in Ponce, Puerto Rico

See also
 Garai (disambiguation)